The Rock Out with Your Socks Out Tour was the first headlining concert tour by Australian pop rock band 5 Seconds of Summer, promoting the band's self-titled debut album. The pre-tour began on 13 November 2014 in Phoenix, Arizona, continuing in Los Angeles, and on 25 February 2015 in Tokyo, Japan. The remainder of the tour commenced on 4 May 2015 in Lisbon, Portugal, at Altice Arena and ended on 13 September 2015 in West Palm Beach, Florida.

Background
In July 2014 the band, consisting of Luke Hemmings, Michael Clifford, Ashton Irwin, and Calum Hood, announced the European headlining dates, and later followed this up with announcements for both Australia and the US.

Opening acts
The Veronicas 
Hey Violet 
State Champs

Setlist
{{hidden
| headercss = background: #d8342b; font-size: 100%; width: 59%;
| contentcss = text-align: left; font-size: 100%; width: 75%;
| header = Europe / Oceania setlist
| content = 4 May — 29 June 2015
"End Up Here"
"Out of My Limit"
"Heartbreak Girl"
"Voodoo Doll"
"Permanent Vacation"
"Don't Stop"
"Disconnected"
"Long Way Home"
"Rejects"
"Heartache On The Big Screen"
"Wrapped Around Your Finger"
"Amnesia"
"Beside You"
"Everything I Didn't Say"
"American Idiot" 
"Kiss Me Kiss Me"
"She Looks So Perfect"
Encore
"Good Girls"
"What I Like About You" 

Notes

}}
{{hidden
| headercss = background: #d8342b; font-size: 100%; width: 59%;
| contentcss = text-align: left; font-size: 100%; width: 75%;
| header = North America setlist
| content = 17 July — 13 September 2015
"End Up Here"
"Out of My Limit"
"Voodoo Doll"
"Permanent Vacation"
"Don't Stop"
"Disconnected"
"Long Way Home"
"Rejects"
"Heartache On The Big Screen"
"Wrapped Around Your Finger"
"Amnesia"
"Beside You"
"Everything I Didn't Say"
"American Idiot" 
"Kiss Me Kiss Me"
"She's Kinda Hot"
"She Looks So Perfect"
Encore
"Good Girls"
"What I Like About You" 

Notes

}}

Tour dates

Notes
Extra date added on 15 June 2015 due to demand.

Extra date added on 10 September 2015 due to demand.

The 23 May 2015 concert in Norwich, United Kingdom was a part of Radio 1's Big Weekend.

Guitarist Michael Clifford incurred burns to his head and left side of his face during "She Looks So Perfect". As a result of his injuries, the band didn't complete the encore.

During the BBC Radio 1's Big Weekend, lead singer and guitarist Luke Hemmings had a case of laryngitis, but proceeded to perform.

During the band's show in Holmdel, New Jersey on 30 August 2015, the band found out onstage that they had won the Video Music Award for "She's Kinda Hot" being Song of the Summer.

References

2015 concert tours
5 Seconds of Summer concert tours
Concert tours of Canada
Concert tours of Portugal
Concert tours of Spain
Concert tours of Italy
Concert tours of Switzerland
Concert tours of Denmark
Concert tours of Sweden
Concert tours of Norway
Concert tours of Germany
Concert tours of the Netherlands
Concert tours of Belgium
Concert tours of France
Concert tours of the United Kingdom
Concert tours of Ireland
Concert tours of New Zealand
Concert tours of Australia
Concert tours of the United States